AEW Dark: Elevation, also known as Dark: Elevation or simply Elevation, is an American professional wrestling streaming television program produced by the American promotion All Elite Wrestling (AEW). New episodes are uploaded every Monday night at 7 p.m. Eastern Time on AEW's YouTube channel. The program is a spinoff of Dark that features matches taped before and after the preceding episode of AEW's flagship program, Dynamite, with a focus on up and rising talent on the AEW roster, as well as wrestlers from the independent circuit.

History
On October 2, 2019, All Elite Wrestling's (AEW) flagship program, Dynamite, premiered on TNT. During the event, there were four dark matches, two before and two after the live broadcast. A program entitled Dark, which began airing on AEW's YouTube channel on Tuesday, October 8, would showcase these dark matches. Unlike the dark matches of other wrestling promotions, which generally do not affect storylines, the matches featured on Dark are part of AEW's storylines and count towards the wrestlers' match statistics.

On February 24, 2021, AEW announced that a new spinoff of Dark would premiere on Monday, March 15 titled AEW Dark: Elevation. The promotion's third weekly program, it was announced that it would stream on Monday nights at 7pm ET on AEW's YouTube channel. It was also announced that Elevation would feature the promotion's established and rising stars, as well as top wrestlers from the independent circuit. Like Dark, matches on the new program maintain storyline continuity and match statistics with AEW's other programming. Wrestling veteran Paul Wight, formerly known as the Big Show in WWE, was announced to be doing commentary for Elevation alongside Tony Schiavone after he was signed. This was later changed to be Matt Menard. With the premiere of Rampage on  August 13, 2021, which also airs on TNT, AEW President and Chief Executive Officer Tony Khan said that Dynamite and Rampage would be AEW's core properties, while their YouTube shows, Dark and Elevation, would be their peripheral properties, essentially their developmental shows.

Roster

The wrestlers featured on All Elite Wrestling take part in scripted feuds and storylines. Wrestlers are portrayed as heroes, villains, or less distinguishable characters in scripted events that build tension and culminate in a wrestling match or series of matches.

Commentators

Ring announcers

References

External links

Dark
2021 American television series debuts
2021 web series debuts
2020s YouTube series
American professional wrestling television series
American non-fiction web series
YouTube original programming
English-language television shows